Wong He (born 27 July 1967), sometimes credited as Wong Hei, is a Hong Kong actor, singer, and presenter.  He is best known for his firefighter roles in TVB's Burning Flame trilogy. As a former police officer, Wong has acted primarily in law enforcement roles during his career at TVB, which gave rise to rumours that his stage name is based on the Cantonese term "皇氣" (lit. "royal air"), a slang term for the Royal Hong Kong Police.  Wong is a practising Buddhist, having converted in 2000.

Early life and police career
Born in Hong Kong as Kwong Ngai-yee (鄺毅怡), Wong He grew up in Lam Tin where he attended SKH Kei Hau Secondary School.  He has an elder sister and a younger brother.  He served in the Royal Hong Kong Police as an airport officer and a Police Tactical Unit member before entering the entertainment industry.

On 24 July 1989, in a case of attempted murder on police officers, Wong charged into a burning building on Nathan Road and saved three of his colleagues from the fire. This incident was remembered as one of the top ten heroic acts within the Hong Kong Police Force in 2010.

Entertainment career
Wong began his entertainment career in 1992 as a radio host for Commercial Radio Hong Kong and later as a host for ATV. It was during his radio days that he picked the stage name "Wong He" for himself, named after a waiter in the novel To Live.

In 1996, Wong joined TVB and starred his first TV series Nothing to Declare.  He became popularly known for his role as Yau Chi Dak ("OK Dak") in the successful TVB drama, Food of Love.  In 1997, Wong received his first nomination for Best Actor at the TVB Anniversary Awards for his performance in Deadly Protection.  Later that year, Wong starred in TVB comedy A Tough Side of a Lady.

In 1998, Wong scored his breakthrough role when he played a firefighter in the classic hit TVB series Burning Flame.  He was nominated as one of the top five finalists for Best Actor at the 1999 TVB Anniversary Awards.  Burning Flame made Wong a household name and led to the reprisal of his firefighter role in the 2002 sequel Burning Flame II.  Wong won My Favourite Television Character Award for his role as Kei Tak Tin in Burning Flame II at the 2002 TVB Anniversary Awards.

In 2000, Wong launched an "au naturel" pictorial book, "Access Wong He," the proceeds of which were all donated to the relief fund for Taiwan's 1999 Jiji earthquake. Wong has also made a number of film appearances in Hong Kong.  He was nominated for Best Supporting Actor at the fifth Golden Bauhinia Awards for The Boss Up There.  In addition, he has starred in several TV series in Singapore, Taiwan, and Mainland China.

As a popular TVB actor, Wong signed a recording contract with Avex Trax.  In 2001, Wong released his debut EP, Xi Xin Chang Ge (喜新唱歌), featuring "Love is the Sea," the ending theme song from A Matter of Customs.  With the success of his debut EP, Wong released his debut album I Believe...Wong He in February 2002.  In September of the same year, Wong released another album Call Me in the Morning.  In addition, he sang the theme songs for several of his TV series, Doomed to Oblivion, Net Deception, Shades of Truth, and Twilight Investigation.

In 2004, Wong played a computer hacker in TVB's Net Deception, which was released overseas in 2004 and in Hong Kong in 2006.  He won the My Favourite Shot Award for his role in Net Deception at the 2005 Astro Wah Lai Toi Drama Awards in Malaysia.  Later in the same year, Wong starred opposite Chilam Cheung in Shades of Truth.

Wong had lead roles in TVB series C.I.B. Files (2006) and Fathers and Sons (2007).  In 2008, he appeared in The Gem of Life.

In 2009, Wong reprised his role as a firefighter in Burning Flame III. In 2010, Wong paired up with Linda Chung in mystery comedy Twilight Investigation and received praises for their performances.

In early 2016, Wong's face was blurred out in a state-run mainland television program (the CCTV adaptation of Korea's Infinite Challenge) following revelations that he had used social media to call attention to a new book that suggested former mainland leader Zhou Enlai might have been homosexual. According to Apple Daily, Wong had previously generated controversy about the extent he identified with China by addressing Beijing airport security personnel as "you Chinese" during a visit to the mainland in 2015.

Filmography

Television

Film

Discography

Albums
 2001 Xi Xin Chang Ge (喜新唱歌) (EP) 
 2002 I Believe...Wong Hei 
 2002 Call Me in the Morning

Television theme songs
 2000 '"Love is the Sea" (戀愛是個海) A Matter of Customs ending theme song 
 2002 "Hardly Confused" (難得糊塗) Doomed to Oblivion opening theme song
 2002 "Scanty with Words" (沉默寡言) Doomed to Oblivion ending theme song 
 2004 "Gray Terror" (灰色恐怖) Net Deception opening theme song 
 2004 "Worth"  (價值) Net Deception ending theme song
 2004 "No Half Space" (沒有半分空間) Shades of Truth theme song 
 2010 "Mind Eater" (食腦) Twilight Investigation theme song

Awards and nominations
1997: Next TV Awards- Most Promising New Actor
1997: Next TV Awards- Top 10 Artists (Ranked #9)
1997: TVB Anniversary Awards- Nominated Best Performance by an Actor in a Drama for Deadly Protection
1998: Next TV Awards- Top 10 Artists (Ranked #10)
1999: TVB Anniversary Awards- Nominated My Favourite Leading Actor of the Year for Burning Flame
1999: TVB Anniversary Awards- Nominated My Favourite On-Screen Partners (Dramas) for Burning Flame
2000: Golden Bauhinia Awards- Nominated Best Supporting Actor for The Boss Up There
2000: TVB Anniversary Awards- Nominated My Favourite Leading Actor of the Year for A Matter of Customs
2000: TVB Anniversary Awards- Nominated My Favourite Television Character for A Matter of Customs
2000: TVB Anniversary Awards- Nominated My Favourite On-Screen Partners (Dramas) for A Matter of Customs
2001: Next TV Awards- Top 10 Artists (Ranked #8)
2002: TVB Anniversary Awards- My Favourite Television Character for Burning Flame II
2002: TVB Anniversary Awards- Nominated My Favourite Leading Actor of the Year for Burning Flame II
2002: TVB Anniversary Awards- Nominated My Favourite On-Screen Partners (Dramas) for Burning Flame II
2003: Hong Kong 3 Weekly Magazine Popularity Awards- Popular Male Artist Award
2005: Malaysia Astro Wah Lai Toi Drama Awards- My Favourite Shot for Net Deception
2005: TVB Anniversary Awards- Nominated Best Actor in a Leading Role for Shades of Truth
2006: TVB Anniversary Awards- Nominated Best Actor for C.I.B. Files
2006: TVB Anniversary Awards- Nominated My Favourite Male Character for C.I.B. Files
2007: TVB Anniversary Awards- Nominated Best Actor for Fathers and Sons
2007: TVB Anniversary Awards- Nominated My Favourite Male Character for Fathers and Sons
2009: Hong Kong Next Magazine Awards- Top 10 Healthy Artists
2009: Singapore i-Weekly Magazine Awards- Top 10 Most Loved Hong Kong Actors (Ranked #8)
2009: TVB Anniversary Awards- Nominated Best Actor for Burning Flame III
2009: TVB Anniversary Awards- Nominated My Favourite Male Character for Burning Flame III
2009: TVB Anniversary Awards- Nominated TVB.com Popular Artist

References

External links

Wong Hei at LoveHKFilm

1967 births
TVB veteran actors
Living people
Hong Kong male television actors
Hong Kong male film actors
Hong Kong male singers
Hong Kong Police Force
Hong Kong police officers
Hong Kong Buddhists
20th-century Hong Kong male actors
21st-century Hong Kong male actors